There have been three baronetcies created for persons with the surname Maitland, two in the Baronetage of Nova Scotia and one in the Baronetage of the United Kingdom. Two of the creations are extant as of 2008 while the other is either dormant or extinct.

The Maitland Baronetcy, of Pitrichies in the County of Aberdeen, was created in the Baronetage of Nova Scotia on 12 March 1672 for Richard Maitland. The title became either extinct or dormant on the death of the fourth Baronet in circa 1704.

The Maitland Baronetcy, of Ravelrig, was created in the Baronetage of Nova Scotia on 18 November 1680 for the Hon. John Maitland, second son of Charles Maitland, 3rd Earl of Lauderdale. In 1695 he succeeded his elder brother as fifth Earl of Lauderdale. See this title for further history of the baronetcy.

The Maitland, later Gibson-Maitland, later Ramsay-Gibson-Maitland, later Maitland Baronetcy, of Clifton in the County of Midlothian, was created in the Baronetage of the United Kingdom on 30 November 1818 for General the Hon. Alexander Maitland. He was the fifth son of Charles Maitland, 6th Earl of Lauderdale (see Earl of Lauderdale for earlier history of the family). The second Baronet assumed the additional surname of Gibson. The third Baronet sat as Member of Parliament for Midlothian. He assumed the additional surname of Ramsay. The fifth Baronet and his successors have used the surname of Maitland only. As of 13 June 2007 the presumed tenth and present Baronet has not successfully proven his succession and is therefore not on the Official Roll of the baronetage, with the baronetcy dormant since 1994. For more information, follow this link.

Frederick Maitland, fourth son of the first Baronet, was a General in the British Army.

Maitland baronets, of Pitrichies (1672)
Sir Richard Maitland, 1st Baronet (died 1677)
Sir Richard Maitland, 2nd Baronet (died 1679)
Sir Charles Maitland, 3rd Baronet (died 1700)
Sir Charles Maitland, 4th Baronet (died )

Maitland baronets, of Ravelrig (1680)
see Earl of Lauderdale

Maitland, later Gibson-Maitland, later Ramsay-Gibson-Maitland, later Maitland baronets, of Clifton (1818)

Sir Alexander Maitland, 1st Baronet (1728–1820)
Sir Alexander Charles Gibson-Maitland, 2nd Baronet (1755–1848)
Sir Alexander Charles Ramsay-Gibson-Maitland, 3rd Baronet (1820–1876)
Sir James Ramsay-Gibson-Maitland, 4th Baronet (1848–1897)
Sir John Nisbet Maitland, 5th Baronet (1850–1936)
Sir John Maitland, 6th Baronet (1879–1949)
Sir George Ramsay Maitland, 7th Baronet (1882–1960)
Sir Alexander Keith Maitland, 8th Baronet (1920–1963)
Sir Richard John Maitland, 9th Baronet (1952–1994)
Charles Alexander Maitland, presumed 10th Baronet (born 1986)

The presumed heir presumptive to the baronetcy is Robert Ramsay Maitland (born 1956), 2nd and youngest son of the 8th Baronet.

Notes

References

Kidd, Charles, Williamson, David (editors). Debrett's Peerage and Baronetage (1990 edition). New York: St Martin's Press, 1990, 

Maitland
Maitland
1672 establishments in the British Empire